This is a list of the mammal species recorded in Iceland. There are twenty-eight mammal species in Iceland, of which four are endangered and four are vulnerable. The only native land mammal, not including vagrant species, is the Arctic fox. This list is derived from the IUCN Red List which lists species of mammals and includes those mammals that have recently been classified as extinct (since 1500 AD).  The taxonomy and naming of the individual species is based on those used in existing Wikipedia articles as of 21 May 2007 and supplemented by the common names and taxonomy from the IUCN, Smithsonian Institution, or University of Michigan where no Wikipedia article was available.

The following tags are used to highlight each species' conservation status as assessed by the International Union for Conservation of Nature:

Order: Rodentia (rodents) 
Rodents make up the largest order of mammals, with over 40% of mammalian species. They have two incisors in the upper and lower jaw which grow continually and must be kept short by gnawing. Most rodents are small though the capybara can weigh up to 45 kg (100 lb).

Suborder: Myomorpha
Family: Muridae (mice, rats, gerbils, etc.)
Subfamily: Murinae
Genus: Apodemus
 Wood mouse, A. sylvaticus  introduced
Genus: Mus
House mouse, M. musculus  introduced
Genus: Rattus
Brown rat, R. norvegicus  introduced
Black rat, R. rattus  introduced

Order: Lagomorpha (rabbits, hares and pikas) 
The lagomorphs comprise two families, Leporidae (hares and rabbits), and Ochotonidae (pikas). Though they can resemble rodents, and were classified as a superfamily in that order until the early 20th century, they have since been considered a separate order. They differ from rodents in a number of physical characteristics, such as having four incisors in the upper jaw rather than two.

Family: Leporidae (rabbits, hares)
Genus: Oryctolagus
European rabbit, O. cuniculus  introduced
Genus: Lepus
Mountain hare, L. timidus  introduced

Order: Cetacea (whales) 

The order Cetacea includes whales, dolphins and porpoises. They are the mammals most fully adapted to aquatic life with a spindle-shaped nearly hairless body, protected by a thick layer of blubber, and forelimbs and tail modified to provide propulsion underwater.

Suborder: Mysticeti
Family: Balaenidae
Genus: Balaena
 Bowhead whale, Balaena mysticetus 
Genus: Eubalaena
 North Atlantic right whale, Eubalaena glacialis 
Family: Balaenopteridae
Subfamily: Balaenopterinae
Genus: Balaenoptera
 Minke whale, Balaenoptera acutorostrata 
 Sei whale, Balaenoptera borealis 
 Blue whale, Balaenoptera musculus 
 Fin whale, Balaenoptera physalus 
Subfamily: Megapterinae
Genus: Megaptera
 Humpback whale, Megaptera novaeangliae 
Family: Eschrichtiidae
Genus: Eschrichtius
 Gray whale, Eschrichtius robustus extirpated from Iceland
Suborder: Odontoceti
Superfamily: Platanistoidea
Family: Monodontidae
Genus: Monodon
 Narwhal, Monodon monoceros 
Genus: Delphinapterus
 Beluga, Delphinapterus leucas 
Family: Phocoenidae
Genus: Phocoena
 Harbour porpoise, Phocoena phocoena 
Family: Ziphidae
Subfamily: Hyperoodontinae
Genus: Hyperoodon
 Northern bottlenose whale, Hyperoodon ampullatus 
Genus: Mesoplodon
 Sowerby's beaked whale, Mesoplodon bidens 
Family: Delphinidae (marine dolphins)
Genus: Lagenorhynchus
 White-beaked dolphin, Lagenorhynchus albirostris 
Atlantic white-sided dolphin, Lagenorhynchus acutus 
Genus: Delphinus
 Short-beaked common dolphin, Delphinus delphis  vagrant
Genus: Stenella
 Striped dolphin, Stenella coeruleoalba 
Genus: Tursiops
 Common bottlenose dolphin, Tursiops truncatus 
Genus: Grampus
 Risso's dolphin, Grampus griseus 
Genus: Orcinus
 Orca, Orcinus orca 
Genus: Globicephala
 Long-finned pilot whale, Globicephala melas 
Family: Physeteridae
Genus: Physeter
 Sperm whale, Physeter macrocephalus

Order: Carnivora (carnivorans) 

There are over 260 species of carnivorans, the majority of which feed primarily on meat. They have a characteristic skull shape and dentition. 
Suborder: Caniformia
Family: Canidae (dogs, foxes)
Genus: Vulpes
 Arctic fox, V. lagopus 
Family: Ursidae (bears)
Genus: Ursus
 Polar bear, Ursus maritimus  vagrant
Family: Odobenidae
Genus: Odobenus
 Walrus, Odobenus rosmarus  vagrant
Family: Phocidae (earless seals)
Genus: Cystophora
 Hooded seal, Cystophora cristata 
Genus: Erignathus
 Bearded seal, Erignathus barbatus 
Genus: Halichoerus
 Grey seal, Halichoerus grypus 
Genus: Pagophilus
 Harp seal, Pagophilus groenlandicus 
Genus: Phoca
 Common seal, Phoca vitulina 
Genus: Pusa
 Ringed seal, Pusa hispida 
Family: Mustelidae (weasels and allies)
Genus: Neogale
American mink, N. vison  introduced

Order: Artiodactyla (even-toed ungulates) 
The even-toed ungulates are ungulates whose weight is borne about equally by the third and fourth toes, rather than mostly or entirely by the third as in perissodactyls. There are about 220 artiodactyl species, including many that are of great economic importance to humans.

Family: Cervidae (deer)
Subfamily: Capreolinae
Genus: Rangifer
Reindeer, R. tarandus  introduced

Order: Chiroptera (bats) 
Bats have been increasingly recorded in Iceland where they are thought to be either vagrants or artificially introduced. The bats' most distinguishing feature is that their forelimbs are developed as wings, making them the only mammals capable of flight. Bat species account for about 20% of all mammals.
Family: Vespertilionidae
Subfamily: Myotinae
Genus: Myotis
Little brown bat, M. lucifugus  vagrant or introduced
Northern long-eared bat, M. septentrionalis  vagrant or introduced
Subfamily: Vespertilioninae
Genus: Eptesicus
 Big brown bat, E. fuscus  vagrant or introduced
Genus: Lasiurus
 Hoary bat, L. cinereus  vagrant or introduced
Genus: Nyctalus
Common noctule, N. noctula  vagrant or introduced
Lesser noctule, N. leisleri  vagrant or introduced
Genus: Pipistrellus
Nathusius' pipistrelle, P. nathusii  vagrant or introduced
Genus: Vespertilio
 Parti-coloured bat, V. murinus  vagrant or introduced

See also
List of chordate orders
Lists of mammals by region
List of prehistoric mammals
Mammal classification
New mammal species

Notes

References
 

Iceland
Environment of Iceland
Mammals
Iceland
Mammals of Iceland